Marzuki was an indie folk rock band from Holland, Michigan, with a significant fan base in western Michigan in the mid- to late-1990s. They were especially popular among Hope College, Calvin College, and Grand Valley State University students. Marzuki's members included Shannon Stephens on vocals and guitar, Jamie Kempkers on cello, Matthew Haseltine (brother of Jars of Clay's Dan Haseltine) on guitar and bass, and Sufjan Stevens on guitar, percussion, and other occasional instruments. Their lyrics often explored spiritual or romantic themes.

Marzuki was named after Sufjan Stevens' brother Marzuki Stevens, a professional long-distance and marathon runner.

Band members
 Shannon Stephens - vocals, guitar
 Jamie Kempkers - cello
 Matthew Haseltine - guitar, bass
 Sufjan Stevens - guitar, percussion, other instruments

Discography
 Marzuki (1996)
 No One Likes a Nervous Wreck (1998)

References

American folk rock groups
Musical groups from Michigan
Sufjan Stevens